Paul Jean Clays (27 November 1819 – 10 February 1900) was a Belgian artist known for his marine paintings.

Biography
In 1851 he made his debut at the Paris Salon and, while he tried to stay in the mainstream, his art was heralded by those who were looking for a change to more realism.

In 1852 he married Marie-Isaure (d. 1860), the daughter of the director of the Brussels Observatory, and moved to Antwerp where he lived from 1852 to 1856; it was during this period that his fortunes began to improve.

In 1856 he and his family moved to Brussels where he became a prolific artist, specializing in scenes along the Scheldt. He exhibited a number of works at the Exposition Universelelle of 1867 and the critic Burger-Thoré described him as one of the greatest marine painters of the time.

In 1868 he became a member of the Société Libre des Beaux-Arts, a society founded on 1 March 1868 to help promote the works of artists who were interested in their individual interpretations of nature. He was a frequent exhibitor at the many exhibition halls in Europe and exhibited many pieces at the Paris Salon.

Overview of his work
He was one of the most esteemed marine painters of his time, and early in his career he substituted a sincere study of nature for the extravagant and artificial conventionality of most of his predecessors. He painted the peaceful life of rivers, the poetry of wide estuaries, the regulated stir of roadsteads and ports. And while he thus broke away from old traditions he also threw off the trammels imposed on him by his master, the marine painter Théodore Gudin (1802–1880). Endeavouring only to give truthful expression to the nature that delighted his eyes, he sought to render the limpid salt atmosphere, the weight of waters, the transparency of moist horizons, the gem-like sparkle of the sky.

A Fleming in his feeling for colour, he set his palette with clean strong hues, and their powerful harmonies were in striking contrast with the rusty, smoky tones then in favour. If he was not a "luminist" in the modern use of the word, he deserves at any rate to be classed with the founders of the modern naturalistic school. This conscientious and healthy interpretation, to which the artist remained faithful, without any important change, to the end of an unusually long and laborious career, attracted those minds which aspired to be bold, and won over those which were moderate. Clays soon took his place among the most famous Belgian painters of his generation, and his pictures, sold at high prices, are to be seen in most public and private galleries.

Works 
We may mention, among others, The Beach at Ault, Boats in a Dutch Port, and Dutch Boats in the Flushing Roads, the last in the National Gallery, London. In the Brussels gallery are The Port of Antwerp, Coast near Ostend, and a Calm on the Scheldt; in the Antwerp museum, The Meuse at Dordrecht; in the Pinakothek at Munich, The Open North Sea; in the Metropolitan Museum of Art, New York, The Festival of the Freedom of the Scheldt at Antwerp in 1863; in the palace of the king of the Belgians, Arrival of Queen Victoria at Ostend in 1857; in the Bruges academy, Port of Feirugudo, Portugal. Clays was a member of several Academies, Belgian and foreign, and of the Order of Leopold (Belgium), the Legion of Honour, etc. See Camille Lemonnier, Histoire des Beaux-Arts (Brussels, 1887).

References 

Attribution

Further reading

 P. & V. Berko, "Dictionary of Belgian painters born between 1750 & 1875", Knokke 1981, pp. 101–103.
 N. Hostyn, Paul-Jean Clays, in : Nationaal Biografisch Woordenboek, 9, Brussels, 1981.

1819 births
1900 deaths
19th-century Belgian painters
19th-century Belgian male artists
Belgian landscape painters
Belgian marine painters
Artists from Bruges